Roscoe William Burson (July 4, 1895 - July 3, 1960) served in the California State Assembly for the 40th district from 1939 to 1941. During World War I he served in the United States Army.

References

External links

United States Army personnel of World War I
Republican Party members of the California State Assembly
1895 births
1960 deaths
People from Fillmore, California